The following list is a discography of production by Fred Warmsley, an American record producer and disc jockey known professionally as Dedekind Cut (formerly Lee Bannon). It includes a list of songs produced, co-produced and remixed by year, artist, album and title.

As Lee Bannon

2008

Sha Stimuli – Love Jones
 12. "Million"

Big Shug – Other Side of the Game
 10. "Better"

2009

The Jacka – Tear Gas
 12. "What's Your Zodiac"

Trife Diesel – Better Late Than Never
 02. "Wanna Be a Rapper"

2010

Lee Bannon – The Big Toy Box
 01. "The Big Toy Box"
 02. "Keep Slippin'"
 03. "Tapanga"
 04. "I"
 05. "The Crook-Ed"
 06. "Out the Blue"
 07. "Baaannnon!!"
 08. "Gone Bad"
 09. "Whats Your Zodiac"
 10. "The Return"
 11. "Them"
 12. "Aaa"
 13. "Whats the Answer"
 14. "Bowl of Rice"
 15. "Arguments"
 16. "I Be the Man"
 17. "Fou You"
 18. "Outro"

Inspectah Deck – Manifesto
 06. "P.S.A."

Lee Bannon – The Big Toy Box 2

 01. "This Is....."
 02. "Welcome Back"
 03. "T.B.M."
 04. "Fuck You"
 05. "Again"
 06. "Sacramento Tempo"
 07. "A Circus Cut"
 08. "0042"
 09. "Try to Be"
 10. "Cloudy"
 11. "A Circus Cut 2"
 12. "Toy Band"
 13. "Yoga!"
 14. "The Travolta"
 15. "Weakness" 
 16. "Love Trifecta"
 17. "A Toy Maker"
 18. "Skip Beat"
 19. "Jungle Math"
 20. "Story Book"
 21. "The Reject"
 22. "Run or Fly"
 23. "Situations"
 24. "Alot"
 25. "Tf2"
 26. "Don't Care Watcha Say"
 27. "A Dolla More"
 28. "Best Dance"
 29. "Why Must I"
 30. "N.A.D.M."
 31. "A Circus Cut 3"
 32. "So Real"
 33. "Try to Be 2"
 34. "5 Steps"
 35. "Toy87"
 36. "A Circus Cut 4"
 37. "Shoe Soul"
 38. "Anytime"
 39. "1 900 Promises"
 40. "Come Up"
 41. ""
 42. "Elims"
 43. "Its Cool"
 44. "A Circus Cut 5"
 45. "Devilish"
 46. "It Was Great"

Willie the Kid and Lee Bannon – Never a Dull Moment
 01. "Blades"
 02. "News Flash"
 03. "Necessary Way" 
 04. "M140 Weighs a Ton"
 05. "Bath Water Running"
 06. "Sky Miles" 
 07. "Hickory Smoke"

Reks – In Between the Lines
 04. "Understand"

So Fresh Clothing – Quit Hatin' on the Bay: Crushing the Block Edition
Disc 2
 11. "Paper Non Stop"

2011

Roc C – Stoned Genius
 09. "Fly Kicks" 
 10. "High Club"

Termanology and Ea$y Money (as S.T.R.E.E.T.) – S.T.R.E.E.T. (Speakin' Thru Real Experience Every Time)
 01. "Inspiration (Intro)"
 02. "Hard Work Pays Off"
 03. "Compared to You"
 04. "Derelict" 
 05. "All My Girls" 
 06. "Go Back" 
 07. "Soul Brothers"
 08. "Shoe Soul"
 09. "M.O.B."
 10. "Rappin Bout Nothing" 
 11. "You Look Better in the Dark"
 12. "Relax" 
 13. "Daddy"
 14. "Value Your Life"

DJ Deadeye – Substance Abuse
 11. "Just In Case"

2012

Lee Bannon – Fantastic Plastic
 01. "Fantastic Plastic" 
 02. "Peaces"
 03. "Phone Drone"
 04. "Grey"
 05. "Search & Destroy" 
 06. "PG&E" 
 07. "In Color" 
 08. "Shout Out to Bannon (In Color)" 
 09. "Lord Gnarlon" 
 10. "Plastic Man" 
 11. "Space Glide"
 12. "The Things" 
 13. "The Noise in Color"
 14. "A Fantastic Good Bye"
 15. "Fantastic Knowledge"
 16. "Something Higher" 
 17. "Scan"
 18. "Out of Here"

Lee Bannon – Caligula Theme Music
 01. "About a Blur"
 02. "Ultra Frown"
 03. "Kings & Stones"
 04. "Caligula Themed Music"
 05. "Crystle Soul"
 06. "Form of Nothing"
 07. "Color Calm"

Strong Arm Steady – Members Only
 06. "One Mistake"

Tribe of Levi – Follow My Lead
 05. "How It All Went Down"
 06. "MVP"
 10. "Tings to Do"
 11. "Take It Easy"

Roc C and Chali 2na (as Ron Artiste') – R.I.D.S. (Riot in Da Stands)
 17. "DOA Laid"

Big Shug – I.M. 4-Eva
 10. "War in the Club"

Smoke DZA – K.O.N.Y.
 02. "JFK"
 09. "Fish Tank"

Pro Era – PEEP: The aPROcalypse
 02. "Run or Fly" 
 17. "Lawns"

2013

Reks – Revolution Cocktail
 06. "Judas"

Joey Bada$$ – Summer Knights
 02. "Hilary $wank"
 07. "47 Goonz" 
 11. "Satellite" 
 12. "95 Til Infinity"

Fat Trel – SDMG
 11. "Make It Clap"

CJ Fly – Thee Way Eye See It
 03. "Ernee"

Lee Bannon – PLACE/CRUSHER
 01. "PLACE/CRUSHER"

Joey Bada$$ – Summer Knights EP
 01. "Hilary $wank"
 04. "95 Til Infinity"
 05. "My Jeep"

Scallops Hotel – Poplar Grove (or How to Rap with a Hammer)
 02. "50 centaurs"

2014

Lee Bannon – Alternate/Endings
 01. "Resorectah"
 02. "NW/WB"
 03. "Prime/Decent"
 04. "Shoot Out the Stars and Win"
 05. "Bent/Sequence"
 06. "Phoebe Cates"
 07. "216"
 08. "Perfect/Division"
 09. "Value 10"
 10. "Cold/Melt"
 11. "Readily/Available"
 12. "Eternal/Attack"
 13. "Alternate/Endings"

Lee Bannon – Never/Mind/The/Darkness/Of/It
 01. "Supremekillah"
 02. "Rellahmatic"
 03. "547"
 04. "H"
 05. "Nevermindthedarknessofit"
 06. "All U Had"
 07. "C.C.S."

Smoke DZA – Dream.ZONE.Achieve
Act I – "Dream"
 02. "Count Me In"

Lee Bannon – Joey Bada$$/Pro Era Instrumentals, Vol. 1
 01. "Untitled PE Instrumental 1"
 02. "Satellite"
 03. "47 Goonz"
 04. "Hilary $wank"
 05. "Enter the Void"
 06. "Untitled PE Instrumental 2"
 07. "Run or Fly"
 08. "95 Til Infinity"
 09. "Untitled 4"
 10. "My Jeep"

Lee Bannon – Caligula Theme Music 2.7.5
 01. "2013" 
 02. "N.W.U.N."
 03. "YG&A" 
 04. "Three Bitches" 
 05. "Working" 
 06. "Strike"
 07. "Working Part 2.7.5"
 08. "Oak Park Dark"
 09. "God Kings"
 10. "L.I.R."

R.F.C. – The Outsiders
 12. "Work (Demo)"

Remixes
 Neneh Cherry – "Spit Three Times"

2015

Joey Bada$$ – B4.DA.$$
 02. "Greenbax (Introlude)"

Lee Bannon – Cope
 01. "2015"
 02. "Cope (The Flood)"
 03. "Song Fi"
 04. "4 Lives"
 05. "Friends"
 06. "Impressions"
 07. "The Muse"
 08. "When We Are Sleeping"

Lee Bannon – Pattern of Excel
 01. "Good / Swimmer"
 02. "Artificial Stasis"
 03. "dx2"
 04. "Suffer Gene"
 05. "Refoah"
 06. "Shallowness Is the Root of All Evil"
 07. "Paofex"
 08. "Kanu"
 09. "Aga"
 10. "Inflatable²"
 11. "DAW in the Sky for Pigs"
 12. "disneµ girls"
 13. "SDM"
 14. "Memory 6"
 15. "Towels"

Mick Jenkins – Wave[s]
 01. "Alchemy"

Wiki – Lil Me
 16. "Sonatine"

As Dedekind Cut

2015

Dedekind Cut – tHot eNhançeR
 01. "Harbinger"
 02. "tHot eNhançeR"
 03. "Further (with an open mouth)"
 04. "Necq"
 05. "True Lover$ knot"

2016

Rabit and Dedekind Cut – R&D
 01. "R&D-i"
 02. "R&D-ii"
 03. "R&D-iii"
 04. "R&D-iv"

Dedekind Cut – LAST
 01. "LAST. I"
 02. "LAST. II"

Dedekind Cut – American Zen
 01. "American Zen 1&2"
 02. "Caution"
 03. "Déjà Vu, in reverse"
 04. "So far…So good"

Dedekind Cut - Successor
Side A
 01. "Descend from Now"
 02. "Instinct"
 03. "Conversation with Angels"
 04. "Fear in Reverse"

Side B
 05. "Maxine"
 06. "☯"
 07. "5ucc3550r"
 08. "Integra"
 09. "46:50"

Bonus tracks
 01. "Untitled"
 02. "In a Room"
 03. "Ayahuasca binary 010"

References
Notes

Citations

External links
 AllMusic:
 
 
 Discogs:
 
 
 
 

Production discographies
Hip hop discographies
Electronic music discographies
Discographies of American artists